Liberty Heights is a 1999 American comedy-drama film written and directed by Barry Levinson. The film is a semi-autobiographical account of his childhood growing up in Baltimore in the 1950s. Portrayed are the racial injustices experienced both by the Jewish and African-American populations. Both of Nate Kurtzman's sons find women "prohibited" to them; for Van because he is Jewish, and for Ben because he is white. Their father goes to prison for running a burlesque show with Little Melvin, an African-American and known local drug dealer.

It is the fourth of Levinson's tetralogy "Baltimore Films", set in his hometown during the 1940s, 1950s, and 1960s: Diner (1982), Tin Men (1987) and Avalon (1990).

Plot
In the fall of 1954, the Kurtzmans, a Jewish family, live in Forest Park, a suburban neighborhood in northwest Baltimore. Nate, the father, runs a burlesque theater, and engages in a numbers racket. His wife Ada is a housewife. Van, the older son, attends the University of Baltimore, and Ben is in his senior year in high school.

Ben meets Sylvia, an African-American girl, who begins attending his school after the district has been integrated. Ben immediately starts to develop feelings towards Sylvia, and introduces himself. They become close based on a mutual love for Little Richard, James Brown, jazz, and black comedians. Sylvia's father, an affluent doctor, disapproves of their relationship and forbids them to see one another.

On Halloween, Ben dresses up as Adolf Hitler, which shocks his parents greatly, and he's forbidden to go in public wearing it. Van and his friends head over to a party in a predominantly bourgeois, gentile section of town. He is attracted to a mysterious blonde woman. A fight between one of Van's buddies and a gentile erupts over his jewishness and Trey, one of the party-goers, drunkenly crashes his car into the house. Van must leave the mystery woman.

Trey goes to court for the car crash. Van and his friends are there as witnesses, but they find ways to avoid testifying against him. After the hearing is over, Van asks several of the other party attendants about the blonde woman he met. Trey discovers that the girl Van has fallen in love with is Dubbie, Trey's own girlfriend.

Meanwhile, Nate's burlesque theatre has problems. In order to boost returns on the numbers game, an additional bonus number is added that will increase the pay-off. Little Melvin, a local drug dealer, makes a large bet, defies expectations, and hits the number. Unable to pay on such a big win, Nate is forced to cut Melvin a 'slice of the pie'. When Nate offers Melvin the numbers business instead, Melvin claims that Nate is trying to "Jew" him out of his money, and a fight breaks out between their bodyguards.

Sylvia gives Ben tickets to see James Brown & The Famous Flames in concert. There, Ben and his friend are the only white patrons in the audience. Van and his friends head out to a gathering, where he again runs into Dubbie and learns she is with Trey.

Little Melvin spots Nate's car off of Pennsylvania Avenue in the African-American neighborhood where James Brown is performing, and after seeing Ben and his friend inside, deduces that one of them must be Nate's son. After the concert, Melvin abducts Ben, Sylvia, and their friends in a payback to Nate's racket.

Van discovers Trey is in surgery after a car accident. He and Dubbie go see him in Virginia. Trey breaks up with her, and on their way back to Maryland, she suggests they stop in a motel. She gets quite drunk, bursts into tears, and then Van realizes  she doesn't really want to be with him.

Nate and his associates from the nightclub are charged and booked with prostitution and racketeering. Before leaving for prison, Nate manages to attend Ben and Sylvia's high school graduation. She is attending Spelman College in Atlanta; he is staying to attend the University of Maryland. As they say goodbye, he steals a kiss, shocking both families

Ben's family is attending a Jewish ceremony as Nate walks out of the synagogue and blows a goodbye kiss to his wife.

Cast

 Adrien Brody as Van
 Ben Foster as Ben
 Orlando Jones as Little Melvin
 Bebe Neuwirth as Ada
 Joe Mantegna as Nate
 Rebekah Johnson as Sylvia
 Gerry Rosenthal as Murray
 David Krumholtz as Yussel
 Justin Chambers as Trey
 Carolyn Murphy as Dubbie
 Kevin Sussman as Alan
 Shane West as Ted
 Anthony Anderson as Scribbles
 Elizabeth Ann Bennett as Mary
 Carlton J. Smith as James Brown
 Richard Kline as Charlie, Nate's Assistant
 Vincent Guastaferro as Pete, Nate's Assistant
 James Pickens Jr. as Sylvia's Father
 Kiersten Warren as Annie the Stripper
 Charley Scalies as Louie
 Katie Finneran as Mrs. Johnson
 Frania Rubinek as Grandma Rose
 Evan Neumann as Sheldon (as Evan Neuman)
 Cloie Wyatt Taylor as Gail
 Ellyn O'Connell as Anne Whittier
 Timothy J. Scanlin Jr. as Nick
 Jake Hoffman as Turk
 Joseph Patrick Abel as Lenny
 Brenda Russell as Singer
 Misha Collins as Guy (uncredited)
 Stacy Keibler as Extra (uncredited)

Liberty Heights marked the last appearance of Ralph Tabakin, who appeared in cameo roles in every Levinson movie since his first, Diner. Tabakin died in 2001.

Reception
The film earned positive reviews from critics, as Liberty Heights currently holds an 86% rating on Rotten Tomatoes based on 49 reviews, with an average rating of 7.3/10. The website's critical consensus reads, "A moving film with moments of humor, Liberty Heights succeeds in capturing the feel of the 1950s with great performances and sensitive direction." On Metacritic, the film has a weighted average score of 75 out of 100, based on 31 critics, indicating "generally favorable reviews".

Soundtrack
Two Liberty Heights soundtracks were released on January 4, 2000: one of the score by Andrea Morricone and one of the music appearing in the film.

References

External links
 Official site
 Barry Levinson official site
 
 
 
 Roger Ebert's review
  for the original soundtrack
  for the Morricone release

1999 films
1990s coming-of-age comedy-drama films
Films set in 1954
Films set in 1955
American coming-of-age comedy-drama films
Films directed by Barry Levinson
Films set in Baltimore
Films shot in Baltimore
Jews and Judaism in Baltimore
Warner Bros. films
Films about brothers
1990s English-language films
1990s American films